SPARK is an international architecture and urban design studio registered in London, Singapore and Shanghai. The studio has designed a variety of projects from complex multiphased mixed-use buildings, city-scale master plans, residential and hotel developments, building regeneration and transformations to small scale urban infill projects.

History 

Founded in 2008, SPARK’s projects include the rejuvenated Clarke Quay in Singapore, the International Cruise Terminal Shanghai, Starhill Gallery Kuala Lumpur, Arte S Penang, Rihan Heights Abu Dhabi, GRiD Singapore, Shekou Gateway Shenzhen and the Raffles City projects in Ningbo and Beijing.

SPARK owes its origins to the studio of British architect William Alsop, where Stephen Pimbley was a partner and worked for 16 years. He led projects such as Cardiff Bay Barrage, the Hôtel du département des Bouches-du-Rhône, Rotterdam Centraal, Calypso and The Public. He designed the transformation of Clarke Quay, leading to the founding of SPARK's first Asia studio in Singapore.

SPARK is known for its research and leadership projects. Each project deals with issues pertinent to problems the community faces in the places where SPARK works.

Partners 

 Ar Stephen Pimbley ARB RIBA
 Wenhui Lim
 Min Wei

Projects

Completed 

 Faifah Learning Center, Bangkok, Thailand, Completed 2012.
 Starhill Gallery, Kuala Lumpur, Malaysia, Completed 2011.
 Clarke Quay, Singapore, Completed 2011.
 One Mont Kiara, Kuala Lumpur, Malaysia, Completed 2010.
 Raffles City Beijing, China, Completed 2009.
 Semarang Paragon City, Semarang, Java, Indonesia, Completed 2009
 International Cruise Terminal, Shanghai, Completed 2010 
 Rihan Heights, Abu Dhabi completed 2012
 Shekou Gateway Shenzhen, completed 2016
 Arte S Penang, completed 2018
 GRiD Singapore, completed 2020

Concept 
 Shanghai Kiss, Shanghai, China, 2004
 Home Farm, 2014
 Solar Orchid, 2015
 Beach Hut, 2016
 Big Arse Toilet, 2018
 Three Little Pigs, 2019

References 

Urban design
Interior design
Landscape architecture
Architecture firms of Singapore
Architecture firms based in London